Meiktila Township is a township of Meiktila District in the Mandalay Division of Burma.

Townships of Mandalay Region